Montblanc may refer to:

 Montblanc, Hérault, a commune of the Hérault département, in France
 Montblanc, Tarragona, a municipality in the province of Tarragona, Catalonia, Spain
 Montblanc (company), a German manufacturer of writing instruments, watches and accessories
 Montblanc (Final Fantasy), a moogle in Final Fantasy Tactics Advance, Final Fantasy Tactics Advance A2, and Final Fantasy XII
 Montblanc Cricket, a character from One Piece

See also
 Monblanc, a commune of the Gers département, in the region of Occitanie in France
 Mont Blanc (disambiguation)

fr:Montblanc